The 2008 season was Lillestrøm SK's 18th season in the Tippeligaen, and their 33rd consecutive season in the top division of Norwegian football.

Pre-season and friendlies

The first pre-season friendly was played on January 18 vs Ham-Kam. On the dates where it was scheduled two matches on the same day, the squad was split in two, playing a match each, complemented by the reserve team.

Tippeligaen

Tippeligaen 2008 starts on March 30

2008 Norwegian Football Cup

Uefa Cup 2008

Transfers

In

Out

Loan in

Loan out

References 

Lillestrøm SK seasons
Lillestrom